Autofiction is a 2006 novel by Japanese author , translated into English by David James Karashima and is a work of "autobiographical fiction". The novel follows Rin in reverse chronological order, from age 22 all the way back to 15. Kanehara recalls some of her previous experiences of living without a home, and various incidents of drug addictions to narrate the plot.

Through her past sexual experiences, Rin's mind has begun to fracture, causing her profound insecurity regarding the relationships around her. At age 22, she is returning from her honeymoon only to become jealous of the air stewardess serving her husband. When he excuses himself to go to the bathroom, Rin's uncontrollable conscience begins to stir, believing he's gone to have sex with the stewardess. As the story unfolds, it becomes clear that Rin's past is a complicated one; filled with grand moments of distrust, abuse relationships and substance abuse. Kanehara adds a gritty tone to her writing. much like a pin that’s constantly prickling your hand. It’s uncomfortable yet manageable; but by the end, you recognise it’s had more of an impact than you first realised. As a nihilist, Rin also suffers from severe anxiety, most noticeably concerning sex – which given the circumstances, is understandable. A woman who becomes jealous on her honeymoon because an air stewardess who was polite to her husband is a woman with a traumatic past.

In 2007, Autofiction was a nomination in the Man Asian Literary Prize.

References

2006 novels
Novels by Hitomi Kanehara
Japanese romance novels